Sir John George Findlay  (21 October 1862 – 7 December 1929) was a New Zealand politician of the Liberal Party, and was a Cabinet minister from 1906 to 1911.

Early life and family
Born in Dunedin in 1862, Findlay graduated from the University of Otago with a Bachelor of Laws in 1886 and LLD in 1893. He was admitted to the Bar in 1887 and practised as a lawyer first in Palmerston North and later in Wellington. He was appointed King's Counsel in 1907.

He and his wife Josephine had three sons: Wilfred, James and Ian.

Political career

When the Attorney-General, Albert Pitt, died in November 1906, there were no suitable members of the legal profession in Parliament. Hence, Joseph Ward appointed Findlay to the Legislative Council on 23 November 1906, and appointed him Attorney-General and Colonial Secretary on the same day. During his tenure of the latter post, which he held until 6 January 1909, it was renamed to Minister of Internal Affairs.

In the 1911 Coronation Honours, Findlay was appointed a Knight Commander of the Order of St Michael and St George.

Hamer says that he was sent to Auckland and contested the Parnell seat, in an attempt of the Liberals who were facing defeat in 1911 to show that they took Auckland seriously. He lost in the second ballot, with Labour, which had been eliminated on the first ballot split over whether to support Findlay or the Reform candidate James Samuel Dickson.

He represented the Hawkes Bay electorate from 1917 to 1919, when he retired.

He died in Horsted Keynes, East Sussex, England, in 1929.

Works by John Findlay

Notes

References

|-

|-

|-

|-

1862 births
1929 deaths
Attorneys-General of New Zealand
New Zealand Knights Commander of the Order of St Michael and St George
New Zealand educators
New Zealand Liberal Party MPs
Members of the Cabinet of New Zealand
Members of the New Zealand Legislative Council
University of Otago alumni
Academic staff of the University of Otago
New Zealand Liberal Party MLCs
New Zealand King's Counsel
Members of the New Zealand House of Representatives
New Zealand MPs for North Island electorates
Unsuccessful candidates in the 1902 New Zealand general election
Unsuccessful candidates in the 1911 New Zealand general election
Colonial Secretaries of New Zealand
Attorneys-General of the Colony of New Zealand
New Zealand politicians awarded knighthoods
People from Horsted Keynes
Justice ministers of New Zealand